Vauvillers may refer to:

Vauvillers, Haute-Saône, a commune in the French region of Franche-Comté
Vauvillers, Somme, a commune in the French region of Picardie